The British Swimming Championships - 50 metres backstroke winners formerly the (Amateur Swimming Association (ASA) National Championships) are listed below.

The event first appeared at the 1991 Championships. Kathy Read (married name Osher) has won a record number of senior National titles (29), which includes five 50 metres backstroke titles.

50 metres backstroke champions

See also
British Swimming
List of British Swimming Championships champions

References

Swimming in the United Kingdom